The Russia national beach soccer team (Sbornaya Rossii po plyazhnomu futbolu) represents Russia in international beach soccer competitions and is controlled by the Russian Football Union, the governing body for football in Russia. The team's highest achievements are three World Cup crowns conquered in 2011, 2013 and 2021.

History
The Serebryany Bor, specifically Beach No. 3, is said to be the birthplace of Russian beach soccer. Players including Andrey Bukhlitskiy and Egor Eremeev used that beach for training and fun games.

Russia debuted at the 1996 Beach Soccer World Championship, with a squad including Vagiz Khidiyatullin, Vyacheslav Chanov and Andrei Yakubik. In their first match against Italy, Russia lost 1–5, which is one of their biggest losses to date. Notwithstanding the overall fifth place at the Championships, beach soccer was not supported by the government for the next 10 years. In 2005, Nikolai Pisarev and other sportsmen suggested Sport's Minister Vitaly Mutko reviving the Russian national beach soccer team. Mutko supported the idea and in the same year Russia participated at the Euro Beach Soccer Cup, sending Mostovoi, Karpin, Nikiforov, Lediakhov, Kiriakov and Popov. Furthermore, one Brazilian consulted the team.

In the following years, Russia progressed. In 2007, players such as Makarov, Shkarin and Bukhlitskiy debuted for the team. That year Russia became third at the Euro Beach Soccer Cup. At the 2007 FIFA Beach Soccer World Cup, Russia finished ninth, and in the following year already sixth. Since Mikhail Likhachev's appointment as head coach in 2010, the team of Russia won the 2011 and 2013 FIFA Beach Soccer World Cup. One of the exceptions was the insufficient result from the World Cup qualification tournament, where Russia was placed 5th at the end and so missed the opportunity to qualify for the 2017 World Cup.

There was some regress for Russia in the 2018 season. While they traditionally played well in the Moscow stage of the Euro Beach Soccer League, winning the group which included the teams of Switzerland, Azerbaijan and Poland, and finishing second in the last Stage in Warnemünde, losing only to Spain, Russia placed second in their team after Italy and so qualified for the 3rd-place match, where they lost to Portugal after penalty shoot-out. For the first time Russia did not finish within the top 3. They rebounded in the Intercontinental Cup, defeating Tahiti and the United States in the group stage. In the semifinals they defeated Brazil after penalty shoot-out, ending the South American's 66-game winning streak, but the Russians were defeated by Iran in the final.

Russia started well in the next season. They qualified for the inaugural World Beach Games after beating Norway, Ukraine, Switzerland and Spain, and proceeded to win silver at that tournament. The team then finished just 6th at the European Games. At the Euro Beach Soccer League, in the first stage, Russia was again placed 2nd in their group after Spain, but still qualified for the Superfinal. Russia rebounded in the FIFA World Cup qualification in Moscow, beating all of their eight opponents to win the title for the second time. In the final Russia beat Italy 7–1.

In the new 2021 season, Russia played their first international matches at the 2021 Euro Beach Soccer League, defeating Turkey, Belarus and Spain in the 1st Stage. As host of the 2021 FIFA Beach Soccer World Cup, Russia automatically qualified for this edition.

Results and fixtures

Matches played within the last 12 months, as well as upcoming fixtures, are displayed.

Legend

2019

2021

Coaching staff 
Source:

Players

Current squad
The national squad for the 2019 FIFA Beach Soccer World Cup.

Coach: Mikhail Likhachev

Player records

Top goalscorers

*Players in bold are still active with Russia.

Records

Team record

Winning streak (22)

Competitive record

Beach Soccer World Championships

FIFA Beach Soccer World Cup

Euro Beach Soccer League

Euro Beach Soccer Cup

Beach Soccer Intercontinental Cup

World Beach Games

European Games

Head-to-head record
Team Russia won 271 (76%) out of 355 matches.

Only main international events are counted

Honours

2007 Season
EBSL Superfinal, Marseille, France: 3rd Place
EBSL Regular Phase Event, Tignes, France: Champions 
EBSL Regular Phase Event, San Benedetto del Tronto, Italy: Champions
2008 Season
ESBL Regular Phase Event, Tignes, France: Champions
2008 FIFA Beach Soccer World Cup, Plage du Prado, France: 6th place
2009 Season
Euro Beach Soccer League Superfinal winners
2010 Season
Euro Beach Soccer Cup, Rome, Italy: champions
2011 Season
2011 Euro Beach Soccer League Superfinal winners
2011 FIFA Beach Soccer World Cup, Marina di Ravenna, Italy: Champions
2011 Beach Soccer Intercontinental Cup, Dubai, United Arab Emirates: Champions

2012 Season
2012 Euro Beach Soccer Cup, Moscow: Champions
2012 Euro Beach Soccer League Superfinal runners-up
2012 Beach Soccer Intercontinental Cup, Dubai: Champions
2013 Season
2013 Euro Beach Soccer League Superfinal winners
2013 FIFA Beach Soccer World Cup, Tahiti: Champions
2013 Beach Soccer Intercontinental Cup, Dubai: Runners-up
2014 Season
2014 Euro Beach Soccer Cup, Baku, Azerbaijan: 3rd place
2014 Euro Beach Soccer League Superfinal winners
2014 Beach Soccer Intercontinental Cup, Dubai: Runners-up
2015 Season
2015 European Games, Baku: Champions
2015 FIFA Beach Soccer World Cup, Portugal: 3rd place
2015 Euro Beach Soccer League Superfinal 3rd place
2015 FIFA Beach Soccer World Cup qualification: Champions
2015 Beach Soccer Intercontinental Cup, Dubai: Champions

2016 Season
2016 Euro Beach Soccer Cup, Belgrade: 3rd place
2016 Euro Beach Soccer League Superfinal 3rd place
2016 Beach Soccer Intercontinental Cup, Dubai: 3rd place
2017 Season
2017 BSWW Mundialito, Cascais: 3rd place
2017 Euro Beach Soccer League Superfinal winners
2018 Season
 2018 Beach Soccer Intercontinental Cup, Dubai: Runners-up
2019 Season
2019 World Beach Games: Runners-up
2019 FIFA Beach Soccer World Cup qualification: Champions
2019 Euro Beach Soccer League Superfinal runners-up
2020 Season
Cancelled due to COVID-19 pandemic
2021 Season
2021 FIFA Beach Soccer World Cup, Moscow, Russia: Champions
2021 Beach Soccer Intercontinental Cup, Dubai: Champions

See also
Russia women's national beach soccer team

References

External links
Russia at FIFA
Russia at BSWW
Russia at Beach Soccer Russia

European national beach soccer teams
Beach soccer
Beach soccer in Russia